Mazandaran Province is one of the 31 provinces of Iran, located along the southern coast of the Caspian Sea and in the adjacent Central Alborz mountain range, in central-northern part of the country. The province covers an area of 23,842 km2. It was founded in 1937.

At the time of the 2006 National Census, the province had a population of 2,893,087 in 783,169 households. The following census in 2011 counted 3,073,943 people in 931,007 households. At the most recent census in 2016, the population had risen to 3,283,582 in 1,084,798 households. Mazandaran province is one of the most densely populated provinces in Iran

The province has diverse natural resources, notably large reservoirs of oil and natural gas. The diverse natural habitats of the province include plains, prairies, forests and rainforest stretching from the sandy beaches of the Caspian Sea to the rugged and snowcapped Alborz sierra, including Mount Damavand, one of the highest peaks and volcanoes in Asia.

Mazandaran is a major producer of farmed fish, and aquaculture provides an important economic addition to traditional dominance of agriculture. Another important contributor to the economy is the tourism industry, as people from all of Iran enjoy visiting the area. Mazandaran is also a fast-growing centre for biotechnology.

Etymology 

Literally "the gate or the valley of the giants" from مازن‎ (mâzan) +‎ در‎ (dar) +‎ ـان‎ (ân), from Avesta.
In Mazandaran, there are places named Div Asiyab, Div Cheshmeh, Div Kela, Div Hamam, etc.

History

Human habitation in the area dates back at least 75,000 years. Recent excavations in Gohar Tape in Rostamkola provide proof that the area has been urbanized for more than 5,000 years, and the area is considered one of the most important historical sites of Iran. It has played an important role in cultural and urban development of the region. Mazandaran is one of the oldest areas without a significant nomadic heritage, thus culturally sedentary.
Indigenous peoples of the region include the ethnic Mazanderanis, who speak an Iranian language which most closely resembles Gilaki and Sangiseri language, but also has phono-typical similarities to several Caucasian languages, reflecting the history of the region and its peoples.

In the early 20th century, Reza Shah connected northern Elbourz to the southern slopes by constructing seven new roads and railways, the provinces of Mazandaran and Gilan became known as Shomal by all Iranians (meaning "the North" in Persian). Mazandaran is a Caspian province in the north of Iran. Located on the southern coast of the Caspian Sea, it is bordered clockwise by Russia (across the sea), Golestan, Semnan, Tehran, Alborz, Qazvin, and Gilan provinces. Sari is the largest city and the capital of Mazandaran province.

Mazandaran province was made part of the Region 1 upon the division of the provinces into five regions solely for coordination and development purposes on June 22, 2014.

Pre-Islamic history

Before the arrival of the Iranian-speakers to Iran, native people of this area were subsistence hunters and cattle herders. Archaeological studies in caves belt and Hutu man in Behshahr in the Mazandaran date to ca. 9500 BCE. The Amard were a tribe living along the mountainous region bordering the Caspian Sea, including current day Amol. Tapuri were a tribe in the Medes south of the Caspian Sea mentioned by Ptolemy and Arrian. Ctesias refers to the land of Tapuri between the two lands of Cadusii and Hyrcania. 

The territory known as Mazandaran has changed hands among various dynasties from early in its history. There are several fortresses remaining from the Parthian Empire and Sasanian Empire, and many older cemeteries scattered throughout the province. During this era, Mazandaran was part of Hyrcania, which was one of the important provinces.
In 662 CE, ten years after the death of Yazdegerd III the last Sasanian emperor, a large Muslim army under the command of Hassan ibn Ali invaded Tabarestan.

With the advent of the Sasanian Empire, the King of Mazandaran (Tabaristan and Padashkhwargar) was Gushnasp, whose ancestors had reigned in the area (under the Parthian empire) since the time of Alexander the Great. In 529–536, Mazandaran was ruled by the Sasanian prince Kawus, son of Kawadh. Anushirawan, the Sasanian king, defeated Zarmihr, who claimed his ancestry from the legendary blacksmith Kaveh. This dynasty ruled the area till 645 AD, when Gil Gilanshah (a descendant of the Sasanian king Jamasp and a grandson of Piruz) joined Mazandaran to Gilan.

In 651 the Sasanid Empire fell, and all of the Sasanid domains gradually came under Arab control, except for the Caspian region of Iran (among which Tabaristan).

Islamic history
Tabaristan maintained an existence independent of the Umayyad Caliphate which supplanted the Sasanian Empire in the early seventh century, with independent Zoroastrian houses like the Bavand and Karen fighting an effective guerilla warfare against Islam. A short-lived Alid Shiite state collapsed before the subsequent take-over by the Ziyarid princes. Mazandaran, unlike much of the rest of the Iranian Plateau maintained a Zoroastrian majority until the 12th century, thanks to its isolation and hardy population which fought against the Caliph's armies for centuries.
During the post-Islamic period the local dynasties fell into three classes: local families of pre-Islamic origin; the ʿAlid sayyid; and local families of secondary importance.

The Bawandids, who claimed descent from Kawus, provided three dynasties. The first dynasty (665–1007) was overthrown on the conquest of Tabaristan by the Ziyarid Kabus b. Wushmgir. The second dynasty reigned from 1073 to 1210, when Mazandaran was conquered by 'Ala al-Din Muhammad Khwarzamshah. The third ruled from 1237 to 1349 as vassals of the Mongols. The last representative of the Bawandids was killed by Afrasiyab Chulawi.

The Karinids claimed descent from Karin, brother of Zarmihr who was the pre-Islamic ruler under the Sasanians. Their last representative Mazyar was put to death in 839.

The Paduspanids claimed descent from the Dabuyids of  the north. They came to prominence around 660 and during the rule of the ʿAlids were their vassals. Later, they were vassals of the Buyids and Bawandids, who deposed them in 1190. The dynasty, restored in 1209–10, survived until the time of Timur; the branch, claiming descent from Kawus the son of Kayumarth reigned until 1567 and the other, that of Iskandar the son of Kayumarth, until 1574.

In the 9th-11th century AD, there were repetitively military raids undertaken by the Rus' between 864 and 1041 on the Caspian Sea shores of Iran, Azerbaijan, and Dagestan as part of the Caspian expeditions of the Rus'. Initially, the Rus' appeared in Serkland in the 9th century traveling as merchants along the Volga trade route, selling furs, honey, and slaves. The first small-scale raids took place in the late 9th and early 10th century. The Rus' undertook the first large-scale expedition in 913; having arrived on 500 ships, they pillaged the westernmost parts of Gorgan as well as Mazandaran and Gilan, taking slaves and goods.

In the Safavid era Mazandaran was settled by very large numbers of Georgians, Circassians, Armenians, and other Peoples of the Caucasus, whose descendants still live or linger across Mazandaran. Towns, villages and neighbourhoods in Mazandaran still bear the name "Gorji" (i.e., Georgian) in them, although most of the large amounts of Georgians, Armenians, and Circassians are already assimilated into the mainstream Mazandaranis. The history of Georgian settlement is described by Iskandar Beg Munshi, the author of the 17th century Tarikh-e Alam-Ara-ye Abbasi, and both the Circassian and Georgian settlements by Pietro Della Valle, among other authors.

Before the reign of Nader Shah, the province was briefly occupied by the Russian army in the aftermath of the Russo-Persian War (1722–23) and returned to Persia in 1735. Following the outcomes of the Russo-Persian War (1804–13) and the Russo-Persian War (1826–28) northern Iran, especially Mazandaran and Gilan, as well as, to a certain extent, Tehran, fell under a growing Russian sphere of influence.

Modern era

During the reign of Fath-Ali Shah Qajar, the verdant region of Mazandaran was paid due attention as a recreational area.
Tapuria remained independent until 1596, when Shah Abbas I, Mazandarani on his mother's side, incorporated Mazandaran into his Safavid empire, forcing many Armenians Circassians, Georgians, to settle in Mazandaran. Pietro della Valle, who visited a town near Firuzkuh in Mazandaran, noted that Mazandarani women never wore the veil and didn't hesitate to talk to foreigners. He also noted the extremely large amount of Circassians and Georgians in the region, and that he had never encountered people with as much civility as the Mazandaranis.

After the Safavid period, the Qajars began to campaign south from Mazandaran with Agha Mohammad Khan who already incorporated Mazandaran into his empire in 1782. On 21 March 1782, Agha Mohammad Shah proclaimed Sari as his imperial capital. Mazandaran was the site of local wars in those years, which led to the transfer of the capital from Sari to Tehran by Fath Ali Shah.
In Modern era at Mazandaran make new house and bridge in Amol and Sari.
In along the beach and in the forest built Villa and modern settlements.

The top provincial official referred to the existence of three international airports and three major sea ports in the province and the visit of millions of Iranian and foreign tourists to Mazandaran, including health tourists.

Geography 

Mazandaran is located on the southern coast of the Caspian Sea. It is bordered clockwise by Golestan, Semnan and Tehran provinces. This province also borders Qazvin and Gilan to the west.

Mazandaran province is geographically divided into two parts: the coastal plains, and the mountainous areas. The Alborz Mountain Range surrounds the coastal strip and the plains abutting the Caspian Sea like a huge wall. Due to the prevailing sea breeze and local winds of the southern and eastern coasts of the Caspian Sea, sandy hills are formed, causing the appearance of a low natural barrier between the sea and plain.
There is often snowfall in the Alborz regions, which run parallel to the Caspian Sea's southern coast, dividing the province into many isolated valleys. The province enjoys a moderate, subtropical climate with an average temperature of 25 °C in summer and about 8 °C in winter. Although snow may fall heavily in the mountains in winter, it rarely falls at sea level.

Ecoregions:
 Caspian Hyrcanian mixed forests
 Elburz Range forest steppe
From these forests,  are used commercially,  are protected and the rest are regarded as forest lands or over-used forests. The Kojoor, Dohezar and Sehezar forest watersheds are located in Mazandaran province.
The Elburz Range forest steppe ecoregion is an arid, mountainous 1,000-kilometer arc south of the Caspian Sea, stretching across northern Iran from the Azerbaijan border to near the Turkmenistan border. The Caspian Hyrcanian mixed forests ecoregion, with its lush green mountainsides and plains that receive moisture from the Caspian Sea, forms this ecoregion's northern border. The vast Central Persian desert basin ecoregion forms its southern border. The Alborz range is composed of a granite core overlain with sedimentary rock including limestones, shales, sandstones, and tuffs. Metamorphic rocks such as schists, marbles, and amphibolite are also widely found. The climate is arid with annual precipitation varying from 150 mm to 500 mm, falling mostly as winter snow.

Environment
The now extinct Caspian tiger and the Caspian horse are two of the animals of Mazandaran province.

The 1971 Ramsar Convention on Wetlands of International Importance especially as Waterfowl Habitat was held in Mazandaran in the city of Ramsar.

Unlike the rest of Iran, Mazandaran is watered by numerous rivers, or mountain torrents, all running from the mountains to the sea. The German traveller Samuel Gottlieb Gmelin, who visited this country in 1771, says that in the space of eight miles, on the road from Resht to Amot, 250 of such streams are to be seen, many of them being so exceedingly broad and deep, that the passage across is sometimes impracticable for weeks together.

Climate

Mazandaran province naturally comes under the influence of the geographical latitude, the Alborz mountain range, elevation from sea level, distance from the sea, and the southern barren areas of Turkmenistan, local and regional air currents, and versatile vegetation cover. These conditions result  in the climatic division of the province into three types: (1) Moderate Caspian weather with hot, humid summers and mild, humid winters, (2) moderate mountainous weather with long, cold and freezing winters and mild and short summers, and (3) cold mountainous weather with long freezing winters and short cool summers. There is often snowfall during most of the seasons in the latter region, which continues till mid-summer.

The western and central plains of the province, up to the northern foothills of the Alborz Mountain Range, experience the mild climate of the Caspian region.
In altitudes of 1,500 to 3,000 meters, a moderate mountainous climate with long, cold winters, and short, mild summers is prevalent. In this region, snow covers parts of the province even into the middle of the warm season. In fact, snow can be observed in this region even in the warmest months of the year.

Administrative divisions 

Mazandaran is divided into 22 counties, each named after its administrative center, except North Savadkuh County (Shirgah), Savadkuh County (Pol Sefid), and Simorgh County (Kiakola).

Cities 

According to the 2016 census, 1,897,238 people (over 57% of the population of Mazandaran province) live in the following cities: Abbasabad 13,482, Alasht 1,193, Amirkola 30,478, Amol 237,528, Arateh 10,327, Babol 250,217, Babolsar 59,966, Bahnemir 7,906, Baladeh 970, Behshahr 94,702, Chalus 65,196, Chamestan 11,194, Dabudasht 1,758, Emamzadeh Abdollah 5,768, Farim 369, Fereydunkenar 38,154, Galugah (Babol) 6,908, Galugah (Galugah) 21,352, Gatab 7,374, Gazanak 319, Hachirud 10,398, Hadishahr 7,889, Izadshahr 7,439, Juybar 32,924, Kelarabad 6,267, Kelardasht 13,401, Ketalem and Sadat Shahr 20,716, Khalil Shahr 11,032, Khorramabad 11,542, Khush Rudpey 5,742, Kiakola 8,040, Kiasar 3,384, Kojur 3,120, Kuhi Kheyl 2,242, Mahmudabad 31,844, Marzanabad 6,698, Marzikola 868, Nashtarud 6,394, Neka 60,991, Nowshahr 49,403, Nur 26,947, Pain Hular 956, Pol Sefid 8,294, Pul 3,150, Qaem Shahr 204,953, Ramsar 35,997, Rineh 982, Rostamkola 11,686, Royan 7,731, Salman Shahr 9,656, Sari 309,820, Shirgah 8,671, Shirud 11,377, Sorkhrud 6,699, Surak 9,208, Tonekabon 55,434, Zargarmahalleh 3,991, and Zirab 16,191.

Most populous cities

The following sorted table, lists the most populous cities in Mazandaran.

Demographics 

The population of the province has been steadily growing during the last 50 years. The following table shows the approximate province population, excluding the Golestan province, which has separated as an independent province in 1998. 

The population is overwhelmingly Mazandarani, with a minority of Gilaks, Azerbaijanis, Kurds, Georgians, Armenians, Circassians, Turkmen and others. 

Mazandarani people have a background in Tabari ethnicity and speak Mazandarni. Their origin goes back to Tapuri people. So their land was called Tapuria, the land of Tapuris. Tapuris were made to migrate to the south coast of the Caspian Sea during the Achaemenid dynasty.

The native people of Sari, Shahi, Babol, Amol, Nowshahr, Chalus, and Tonekabon are Mazandarani people and speak the Mazandarani language.

The eastern Gīlakī dialect is spoken in the entire valley of the Čālūs river, though Kurdish tribes were established in the yeylāq of Kojūr and Kalārdašt in the Qajar period. Today Kurds in Mazandaran are mostly known as Khajevand Kurds and form majority of the cities of Kelardasht, Abbasabad, Nowshahr, Chalus and Kajur. Other Kurdish tribes in Mazandaran province are Modanlu (In Sari), Jahanbeiglou (In Sari), Abdolmaleki (In Behshahr), Jalalvand (In Ramsar) and Amarlu (In Tonekabon).

The Mazandarani inhabit the majority of the province. The closely-related Gilaks form the largest minority and are concentrated in Ramsar, Tonekabon.

In recent years the region has seen an influx of Iranians from other regions of Iran, many of them attracted by its nature and seaside.

Language 

Mazanderani or Tabari is a Northwestern Iranian language. Various Mazandarani dialects exist which are spoken in Mazandaran province and the neighbor province Golestan such as Mazanderani, and Gorgani and possibly Qadikolahi (Ghadikolahi) and Palani. Today, Mazandaranis also use Persian (Western Persian). The educated can communicate and read Persian well.

Mazandarani people have a background in Tabari ethnicity and speak Mazandarni. Their origin goes back to Tapuri people. So their land was called Tapuria, the land of Tapuris. Tapuris were made to migrate to the south coast of the Caspian Sea during the Achaemenid dynasty.

The native people of Sari, shahi, babol, Amol, Nowshahr, Chalus, and Tonekabon are Mazandarani people and speak the Mazandarani language.

The people residing in Chalus speak Mazanderani language. The dialect of Kalarestaqi is spoken in the west of Chalus and the dialect of Kojuri in the east.

The people residing in Nowshahr speak the Kojuri-dialect of Mazanderani language.

The closely-related Gilaks form the largest minority in Mazandaran. They speak the Gilaki language and are concentrated in Ramsar, and Tonekabon. The native people in Ramsar are Gilaks although there are also Mazandarani people living there. They speak the Gilaki language although the style they speak has been influenced by the Mazandarani language, making it slightly different than the Gilaki spoken in Gilan.

The eastern Gīlakī dialect is spoken in the entire valley of the Čālūs river (Bazin and Bromberger, p. 13), though some Kurdish tribes were established in the yeylāq of Kojūr and Kalārdašt in the Qajar period (Planhol, p. 38).

A dialect of Azeri is spoken in the town of Galoogah.

Transportation

Train
The Mazandaran train station is the city's first modern rail station and it dates from the Pahlavi dynasty.

Roads
Mazandaran is connected to Tehran by Haraz road (Amol-Rudehen), Kandovan road (Chalus-Karaj), and Firoozkooh road (Savadkuh).

Airports
Dasht-e Naz Airport, serving the capital Sari, Noshahr Airport, and Ramsar International Airport are the domestic airports that connect the province to the other parts of the country.

Railway

Mazandaran is served by the North Railway Dept. of the Iranian Railways. The department connects the province to Tehran to the south and Gorgan to the east. The cities of Sari, Qaemshahr, and Pol Sefid are major stations of the department.
The Trans-Iranian Railway was a major railway building project started in 1927 and completed in 1938, under the direction of the Iranian monarch, Reza Shah, and entirely with indigenous capital. It links the capital Tehran with the Persian Gulf and Caspian Sea.

In literature

In the Persian epic, Shahnameh, Mazandaran is mentioned in two different sections. The first mention is implicit, when Fereydun sets its capital in a city called Tamishe near Amol:

بیاراست گیتی بسان بهشت.................... به جای گیا سرو گلبن بکشت

از آمل گذر سوی تمیشه کرد .............. نشست اندر آن نامور بیشه کرد

And when Manuchehr is returning to Fereydun's capital, Tamisheh in Mazandaran (known as Tabarestan), after his victory over Salm and Tur.

In the second section, a region called Mazandaran is mentioned in the Kai Kavoos era; it is an area which is mostly inhabited by Div (demons). The legendary Iranian Shah Kaykavoos, as well as the Iranian hero Rostam, each take turn to go to Mazandaran in order to battle the demons.

In a verse from Shahnameh, Zal tells Kai Kavoos: "I heard troubling news that the king is planning to go to Mazandaran".

However, this Mazandaran is not considered identical to the modern province of Mazandaran, and is instead a land to the west of Iran.  The current province was simply considered a part of Tabaristan; the name Mazandaran is a later development, perhaps based upon local terminology.

In Gaston Leroux's The Phantom of the Opera, one of the characters was formerly the daroga (chief of police) of Mazanderan.

Nowruz
The Tabarian New Year, or Neowrez, occurs in the pintek days of the Tabarian Calendar. 
In the Mazandarani language of Iran in the Mazanderani calendar, the year is divided into 12 thirty-day months and one pentad of days, often beginning on March 21.  Neowrez Khani is one of the strongest and most popular traditions of the Mazanderani people.

Ceremonies and events
Tirgan is a mid summer Iranian festival, celebrated annually on Tir 13 (July 3, 4, or 5). It is performed by splashing water, dancing, reciting poetry, and serving traditional foods such as spinach soup and shole-zard. The custom of tying rainbow-colored bands on wrists, which are worn for ten days and then thrown into a stream, is also a way to rejoice for children.
Other famous events like, Varf chal, traditional ceremony with almost 800 years old as one of the unique rituals of Mazandaran associated with water was held in the village of Ab Ask and Lochu Wrestling game in different time.

Music and dance
Music in this region relates to the lifestyle of the inhabitants, and the melodies revolve around issues such as the forests, cultivation or farming activities and herding. The most famous dance of this area is the Shomali dance, not forgetting the stick dance that the men perform. Popular music in the province, known as the Taleb and Zohre, Amiri Khani and Katuli.

Tourism
Over 15 million Iranian and some 400,000 foreign tourists visit the province annually. More than 800 registered historical and cultural sites, 338 kilometers of shorelines, mineral springs in jungles and mountains, waterfalls, and caves are among the major tourism attractions in the Mazandaran province.

Filband, a village near the northern Iranian city of Babol in Mazandaran Province, is famous for its skies which are full of interconnected cumulus clouds, especially in springtime.
Mazandaran has been picked as the tourism capital of Economic Cooperation Organization (ECO) members states in 2022.

Historical and natural tourist attractions

 Mount Damavand
 Abbas Abad Garden, Behshahr
 Mausoleum of Mir Bozorg
 Kandolus
 largan
 Tomb of Haydar Amuli
 Safi Abad Palace
 Ramsar Palace
 Malek Bahman Castle
 Lajim Tower, Savadkuh
 Miankaleh peninsula
 Veresk Bridge
 Castle Poolad Baladeh
 Davazdah Cheshmeh Bridge
 Moalagh Bridge, Amol
 Shapour Bridge, Juybar
 Bathroom Vaziri, Sari
 Tomb Darvish Fakhruddin Babol
 History Museum Amol
 Museum of Babol
 Larijan Hot Spring
 Shah Neshin Castle
 Lake Valasht
 Gerdkooh ancient hill
 Gohar Tapeh
 Lar Dam
 Alam-Kuh
 Lar National Park
 Badab-e Surt
 Tomb of Imamzadeh Abbas
 Kandolus Museum Nowshahr
 Fire Temple of Amol
 Farahabad Complex
 Safi Abad Palace
 Bagh Shah, Behshahr
 Imamzadeh Ebrahim Amol
 Imamzadeh Ebrahim Babolsar
 Imamzadeh Yahya Sari
 Imamzadeh Qasem Babol
 See Sangan Jungle
 Alendan lake
 Watch Tower Babol
 Abpari Waterfall
 Cave Zangian Qaemshahr
 Alimastan Village
 Cheshmeh Kileh Bridge, Tonekabon
 Shahrak-e Namak Abrud
 Huto and Kamarband Caves
 Cemetery Sefid Chah
 Cheshmeh Kileh Bridge Tonekabon
 Resket Tower
 Shapur Place, Babol
 Waterfall Tircan
 Nassereddin Shah relief
 Jameh Mosque of Amol
 Jameh Mosque of Sari
 Elburz Range forest steppe
 Bridge Felezi of Babolsar
 Imam Hassan Askari Mosque
 Chai Khoran Palace, Chalus
 Lake Miansheh
 Forest Park Nur
 Clock tower Sari
 Haraz River
 Gerdkooh ancient hill
 Mount Takht-e Suleyman
 Waterfall Sangeno
 Heshtel Towers
 Amoloo Mineral Water Spring
 Harijan Village Chalus
 Tamishan Palace Noor
 Div Sefid Cave
 Cemetery Ispe Chah
 Alasht Village
 Cemetery Ispe Chah
 Zangian Cave
 Cheshmeh Imarat Behshar
 Mohammad Hassan Khan Bridge, Babol
 Haft Abshar Waterfall, Babol
 Hill Qlaya Ghale Kety
 Bathroom Vaziri, Sari
 House Kalbadi, Sari
 House Manouchehri, Amol
 Palace of Shapur
 Temple Kowsan
 Cave rostam Kola
 Garden Chehelsotoon
 Mansion Municipal Tonekabon
 Kangelo Castle, Savadkuh
 Tower Shervin Bavand
 Church sourkh Abad
 Watchtower of Babol
 Tomb Shah baloo zahid Amuli
 Heshtel Tower
 Mosque Jameh of Babol
 Mosque Mohadesin
 Tomb of Ibn-e Shahr Ashoob
 Imamzadeh Sayyid Ali kia Sultan
 Tomb of Seyed Mohammad Zarrin Nava
 Herijan Waterfall
 Deryouk Waterfall
 Espe-o Waterfall
 Kiasar Waterfall
 Takieh Taker
 Tower Shervin Bavand
 Lake Sahon
 Mohaddesin Mosque of Babol
 Tomb Soltan Mohammad-e Taher
 Tomb of Ibn Shahrashub
 Forest Park Chaldareh
 Forest Park Shahid Zare
 Forest Park Mirza Kuchik Khan Haraz
 Forst Park Kashpel
 Javarem Forest park
 Tamishan Palace
 Div Sefid Cave
 Marko Summit
 Forst Park Dalkhani
 Do hezar Village
 Abe ask Village
 Shahrak-e Darya Kenar
 Lavij Village
 Sheikh Musa Village
 Forest Sange no, Neka
 Amoloo mineral water Springs
 Ramsar mineral water Springs
 Pahlavi Hotel Qaem Shahr
 Band-e Borideh River
 Bazaar of Amol
 Ramsar Palace
 Ramsar Parsian Hotel
 Clock Tower of Sari
 Waterfall Sangeno
 Cellar Kafer Keli
 Imamzadeh Hashem Amol
 Shahandasht Waterfall
 Shoormast Lake, Savadkuh
 Figure King Haraz
 Kelardasht
 Ramedani Historical House, Sari
 Estakhr-e-Posht Lake
 Paband National Park
 Mal Khast Village
 Kiasar National Park
 Heyrat Village
 Sarandoon and Balandoon

Notable people
People from and/or active in Mazandaran Province or its historical region include:

Authors

 Muhammad ibn Jarir al-Tabari (838-923), was a Tabari world historian and theologian (the most famous and widely influential person called al-Tabari).
 Espahbod Sa'ad ad-Din Varavini who wrote the book called Marzuban-nama, and also a Divan of poetry in the Ṭabarí dialect, known as the Níkí-nama.
 Ibn Isfandiyar, historian, author of a history of Tabaristan (Tarikh-i Tabaristan).
 Mírzá Asadu’llah Fádil Mázandarání (1880–1957), Iranian Bahá'í scholar.
 Musa ibn Khalil Mazandarani, 19th century Mazandarani scribe and scholar.
 Zahir al-Din Mar'ashi
 Manouchehr Sotoudeh
 Parviz Natel-Khanlari
 Ali Yachkaschi

Poetry

 Nima Youshij
 Reza-Qoli Khan Hedayat
 Mohammad Zohari
 Amir Pazevari
 Taleb Amoli 
 Mina Assadi
 Seyed Karim Amiri Firuzkuhi
 Fereydoun Rahnema
 Mohsen Emadi

Music

 Gholam Hossein Banan
 Benyamin Bahadori
 Abdolhossein Mokhtabad
 Delkash
 Bijan Mortazavi
 Mohammad Donyavi
 Afshin
 Benyamin Bahadori
 Farhang Sharif
 Parisa
 Simin Ghanem
 Majid Akhshabi
 Mehdi Rajabian

Architecture

 Omar Tiberiades (Abû Hafs 'Umar ibn al-Farrukhân al-Tabarî Amoli) (d.c.815), Persian astrologer and architect.
 Abolhassan Sadighi

Cinema

 Shahab Hosseini
 Davoud Rashidi
 Khosrow Sinai
 Kambiz Dirbaz
 Ladan Mostofi
 Mostafa Zamani
 Mohammad Ali Sadjadi
 Anahita Hemmati
 Roya Nonahali
 Irene Zazians
 Reza Allamehzadeh
 Abbas Amiri Moghaddam
 Saba Kamali
 Mohammad Hossein Mahdavian
 Ardalan Shoja Kaveh
 Parinaz Izadyar
 Maryam Kavyani
 Leyli Rashidi
 Amrolah Saberi
 Hossein Gil
 Zinat Pirzadeh
 Hossein Rajabian

Portraiture

 Mokarrameh Ghanbari
 Kourosh Sotoodeh
 Towhidi Tabari
 Abolhassan Sadighi
 Ahmad Esfandiari

Scholars

 Sadegh Hedayat
 Mohammad Taqi Danesh Pajouh
 Ahmad Ghahreman
 Ali Yachkaschi
 Esfandiar Esfandiari
 Rahimberdi Annamoradnejad

History

 Arash
 Maziar

Science

 Ali ibn Sahl Rabban al-Tabari His stature was eclipsed by his more famous pupil, Muhammad ibn Zakarīya Rāzi.
 Abul Hasan al-Tabari, a 10th-century Iranian physician.
 Abu'l Tayyeb Tabari was jurisconsult, judge (qāżī), and professor of legal sciences; he was regarded by his contemporaries as one of the leading Shafeʿites of 5th/11th century Baghdad.
 Ali Yachkaschi
 Moslem Bahadori
 Iraj Malekpour
 Alireza Mashaghi
 Pooran Farrokhzad
 Shahrokh Meskoob
 Al-Tabarani

Philosophy

 Fakhr al-Din al-Razi Theologian and philosopher.
 Farhad Rachidi

Physicians and astrologers

 Muhammad ibn Mahmud Amuli
 Abū Sahl al-Qūhī
 Al-Nagawri
 Sahl ibn Bishr
 Muhammad ibn Ayyub Tabari
 Yahya ibn Abi Mansur
 Al-Nagawri
 Tunakabuni
 Al-Natili
 Haseb-i Tabari

Athletics

 Abdollah Movahed 
 Imam-Ali Habibi
 Behdad Salimi
 Ghasem Rezaei
 Hassan Rangraz
 Reza Yazdani
 Hassan Yazdani
 Reza Soukhteh-Saraei
 Askari Mohammadian
 Mehdi Taghavi
 Komeil Ghasemi
 Morad Mohammadi
 Ahmad Mohammadi
 Mehdi Hajizadeh
 Masoud Esmaeilpour
 Ezzatollah Akbari
 Ali Asghar Bazri
 Bashir Babajanzadeh
 Reza Simkhah
 Mohammad Reza Khalatbari
 Farhad Majidi
 Rahman Rezaei
 Mehrdad Oladi
 Mohsen Bengar
 Peiman Hosseini
 Rahman Ahmadi
 Hossein Tavakkoli
 Hanif Omranzadeh
 Hadi Norouzi
 Adel Gholami
 Alireza Firouzja
 Mojtaba Mirzajanpour
 Sheys Rezaei
 Morteza Pouraliganji
 Mojtaba Abedini
 Sohrab Entezari
 Farshid Talebi
 Mousa Nabipour
 Shahab Gordan
 Noshad Alamiyan
 Sousan Hajipour
 Mahmoud Fekri
 Peyman Hosseini
 Ramin Rezaeian
 Bahador Molaei
 Maysam Baou
 Omid Ebrahimi
 Morteza Mehrzad
 Shoja Khalilzadeh
 Omid Alishah
 Hamed Kavianpour
 Abbas Hajkenari
 Kianoush Rahmati
 Ebrahim Taghipour
 Mohsen Yousefi
 Javad Asghari Moghaddam
 Manouchehr Boroumand
 Jasem Delavari
 Behnam Ehsanpour
 Mehrdad Pooladi
 Majid Torkan
 Mohsen Karimi
 Hamed Kavianpour
 Farzan Ashourzadeh
 Ahmad Mohammadi
 Ali Alipour
 Javad Manafi
 Nima Alamian
 Mohammad Reza Barari
 Ramezan Kheder
 Abbas Dabbaghi
 Reza Simkhah
 Hassan Rahnavardi
 Babak Nourzad
 Ali Asghar Bazri
 Sousan Hajipour
 Anoushiravan Nourian
 Farshid Talebi
 Allahyar Sayyadmanesh
 Ahmad Mohammadi
 Mohsen Karimi

Royalty

 Reza Shah Pahlavi He was the Shah of Iran (Persia) from 15 December 1925 until he was forced to abdicate by the Anglo-Soviet invasion of Iran on 16 September 1941.
 Mohammad Reza Pahlavi
 Dowlatshah
 Khayr al-Nisa Begum
 Khurshid of Tabaristan

Military

 Ali Akbar Shiroodi
 Abbas Mirza
 Ahmad Keshvari
 Manouchehr Khosrodad
 Al-Mu'ayyad Ahmad
 Sardar Rafie Yanehsari
 Mohammad Rouyanian
 Iskandar-i Shaykhi
 Hossein Khalatbari
 Bahram Aryana
 Ahmad Keshvari
 Massoud Monfared Niyaki
 Jahangir IV
 Abdollah Khajeh Nuri

Politics

 Ali Larijani
 Mohammad Vali Khan Tonekaboni
 Manuchehr Mottaki
 Ehsan Tabari
 Majid Rahnema
 Hossein Ghods-Nakhai
 Noureddin Kianouri 
 Ali-Akbar Davar
 Esfandiar Rahim Mashaei
 Reza Salehi Amiri
 Hamid Reza Chitgar
 Sadeq Larijani
 Mohammad-Javad Larijani
 Bagher Larijani
 Ali Akbar Nategh-Nouri
 Mirza Aqa Khan Nuri
 Morteza Gholi Khan Hedayat
 Ahmad Tavakoli
 Davoud Hermidas-Bavand
 Sam Dastyari
 Reza-Qoli Khan Hedayat
 Hossein Rajabian
 Ali Kordan
 Ahmad Moshir al-Saltaneh
 Elaheh Koulaei
 Abdul Karim Hashemi Nejad
 Reza Sheykholeslam
 Shamseddin Hosseini
 Hassan Ghashghavi
 Mirza Shafi Mazandarani
 Sheikh Khalifa Mazandarani
 Gholam Hossein Sadighi
 Mirza Hassan Khan Esfandiary
 Davoud Hermidas-Bavand
 Haji Washington
 Hossein Dadgar
 Mirza Hassan Khan Esfandiary
 Ali Gholi Khan Mokhber-ol Doleh
 Musa Nuri Esfandiari
 Ali Khan Kamal-Hedayat
 Zeinolabedin Rahnama
 Morteza Gholi Khan Hedayat
 Mehdi Qoli Hedayat
 Abdol-samad Mirza Ezz ed-Dowleh Saloor
 Mehdi Qoli Hedayat
 Hossein Shah-Hosseini
 Fazel Larijani
 Musa Nuri Esfandiari
 Javad Saeed
 Farhad Dejpasand
 Anoushiravan Mohseni Bandpei
 Kamal Hedayat
 Abdol Amir Rashidi Haeri

Christianity

 Hossein Fallah Noshirvani

Islamic scholars

 Hassan Hassanzadeh Amoli
 Abdollah Javadi-Amoli
 Mirza Hashem Amoli
 Abd al-Qahir al-Jurjani
 Muhammad Taqi Amoli
 Haydar Amuli
 Ibn Furak
 Ali Asghar Mazandarani
 Mirza Husain Noori Tabarsi
 Mohammad Taghi Falsafi
 Ibn Shahr Ashub
 Shaykh Tabarsi
 Imad al-Din al-Tabari
 Rustam al-Tabari
 Abul-Abbas Qassab Amoli
 Yasubedin Rastegar Jooybari
 Mulla Ali Kani
 Mohaddes Nouri
 Mirza Muhammad Taqi Noori Tabarsi
 Yasubedin Rastegar Jooybari
 Mohammad Salih al-Mazandarani
 Ibn al-Sheikh
 Molla Mohammad Saleh Mazandarani

Other religions

 Baháʼu'lláh- The founder of the Baháʼí Faith was born and grew up in Nur, Mazandaran
 Mírzá ʻAbbás Núrí - father of Baháʼu'lláh
 ʻAbdu'l-Bahá - son of Baháʼu'lláh
 Daniel al-Kumisi
 Quddús
 Subh-i-Azal

Master

 Kourosh Mansory
 Gholam-Ali Soleimani
 Farshid Moussavi
 Maria Khorsand
 Behdad Esfahbod
 Hossein Fallah Noshirvani

Medical

 Moslem Bahadori

Mazandaran today

Cuisine

The cuisine of the province is very rich in seafood due to its location by the Caspian Sea, and rice is present in virtually every meal. Mazandarani cuisine is diverse between regions; the cuisine of coastal regions is different from mountainous regions, as people in the Alborz usually use the indigenous herbs and coastal people use the dishes of fish and Caspian Mazandaran rice with vegetables.

Economy

The province is one of the 5 wealthiest in Iran. Oil wealth has stimulated industries in food processing, cement, textiles, cotton, and fishing (caviar). Iran's Cultural Heritage Organization lists close to 630 sites of historical and cultural significance, many of which are tourist attractions. Rice, grain, fruits, cotton, tea, tobacco, sugarcane, Flower, Mineral water, caviar, Dairy product, Meat industry and silk are produced in the lowland strip along the Caspian shore. Oil wealth has stimulated industries in food processing, cement, textiles, cotton, and fishing (caviar).
Mazandaran, with 230,000 hectares of paddies, produces about one million tonnes of rice a year, or 42 percent of the country's total.
Over 70 kinds of agricultural produce are grown in Mazandaran that meets 40% of domestic demand for rice and 50% of citrus fruits. The province is also the sole domestic supplier of kiwi.
Mazandaran has 3,500 industrial and production units.

Export 
Germany, Russia, Iraq, France Turkey, Kazakhstan, India, Malaysia, United Arab Emirates, Afghanistan, Belarus, Italy, Bahrain, Pakistan, Switzerland Ukraine, United States, Spain, Netherlands and Central Asian countries were Mazandaran's main export destinations during the period. The province in 2017 exported close to $800 million worth of goods. In the previous year totally about 800 million dollars of non-oil goods produced in Mazandaran were exported, half of which were exported from customs outside the province. In 2017 year main exports from the province consisted of dairy products (57%), food products (12%), industrial commodities (10%), pipes and profiles (8%) and cement (7%).

Station 
Mazandaran is also a fast-growing centre for tourist, innovation, biotechnology and civil engineering.

Gas and oil 
From 1951 to 1978, and particularly after the formation of National Iranian Oil Company (NIOC), the first exploration well was spudded. Up to 1970, 16 wells had been drilled near mud volcanoes. All these wells produced only natural gas and technical studies showed that continuation of these operations would be uneconomical.
10 thousand tons export oil and Uncertain amount of gas exported to Asian countries from Mazandaran.

Statistics
 9th rank industrial units Iran
 5th rank general industry Iran
 4th rank tooling machines Iran
 2nd rank coal Iran
 1st rank livestock and agricultural products Iran
 1st rank granite Iran
 1st rank fluorine Iran
 1st rank flowers and ornamental plants Iran
 1st rank citrus exports Iran
 1st rank food products exports Iran

Colleges and universities

Main universities of Mazandaran:
 University of Mazandaran, Babolsar
 Mazandaran University of Medical Sciences, Sari
 Babol Noshirvani University of Technology, Babol
 Babol University of Medical Sciences, Babol
 Sari Agricultural Sciences and Natural Resources University, Sari
 Shomal University, Amol
 Allameh Mohaddes Nouri University, Nur
 Imam Khomeini Naval University, Nowshahr
 University of Science and Technology of Mazandaran, Behshahr
 Iran University of Science and Technology, Nur

Sports
For the past several years Mazandaran has generated a consistent stream of wrestlers. Football and volleyball are two other popular sports that have a lot of players in the Premier League and the national team. Weightlifting, Taekwondo, table tennis, boxing, kickboxing, kung fu, karate, rally car are other successful sports in the province. Kalleh Mazandaran VC, Shamoushak Noshahr F.C. and F.C. Nassaji Mazandaran are three famous teams in the province. Kalleh have twice won the Iranian Volleyball Super League Championship and once the AVC Championship.

Sister provinces
  Astrakhan
  Marche
  Dar es Salaam
  Issyk-Kul
  Mekong Delta

See also
 Tapurian people  Mazandarani people.
 List of Mazanderanis
 Amardi
 Sasanian dynasty
 Maziar
 Tabaristan
 Dabuyid dynasty
 Pahlavi dynasty

References

Further reading

External links

 Official website
mazendron on instagram
 Mazandaran Cultural Heritage Organization
 Official website of Mazandaran TV
  (Bibliography)
 Registration Mazandaran
 A Mazandarani folk-song sung by Shusha Guppy in the 1970s: Darling Dareyne

 
Provinces of Iran
Alborz (mountain range)
States and territories established in 1937